Igralishte Peak is the ice-covered peak rising to 1690 m in Havre Mountains, northern Alexander Island in Antarctica. It surmounts Hadzhiev Glacier to the northeast and Wubbold Glacier to the south. The feature is named after the settlement of Igralishte in Southwestern Bulgaria.

Location

Maps
 British Antarctic Territory. Scale 1:200000 topographic map. DOS 610 – W 69 70. Tolworth, UK, 1971
 Antarctic Digital Database (ADD). Scale 1:250000 topographic map of Antarctica. Scientific Committee on Antarctic Research (SCAR). Since 1993, regularly upgraded and updated

Notes

References
 Bulgarian Antarctic Gazetteer. Antarctic Place-names Commission. (details in Bulgarian, basic data in English)
 Igralishte Peak. SCAR Composite Gazetteer of Antarctica

External links
 Igralishte Peak. Copernix satellite image

Mountains of Alexander Island
Bulgaria and the Antarctic